"For Real (There's Nothing Quite Like the Blinding Light)" is a 2005 single by indie band Okkervil River, released prior to the album Black Sheep Boy. The single features an extended version of "For Real", with "The Next Four Months" and "For the Enemy" as B-sides. "The Next Four Months" is an outtake from Black Sheep Boy, and "For the Enemy" is a live recording, performed while the band members were intoxicated.

Track listing
"For Real" – 5:32
"The Next Four Months" – 3:31
"For the Enemy (Live)" – 8:55

References

2005 songs